The men's basketball tournament at the 1991 Pan American Games was held from August 3 to 17, 1991 in Havana, Cuba. The women also competed in the Cuban capital, from August 3 to 12.Juegos Panamericanos on Urubasket Coliseo de la Ciudad Deportiva was the venue for the games.

Men's competition

Participating nations

Preliminary round

 1991-08-03

 1991-08-04

 1991-08-05

 1991-08-06

 1991-08-07

 1991-08-08

 1991-08-09

 1991-08-10

 1991-08-04

 1991-08-05

 1991-08-06

 1991-08-07

 1991-08-08

 1991-08-09

 1991-08-10

Quarterfinals
 1991-08-12

Semifinals
 1991-08-13 — 5th/8th place

 1991-08-15 — 1st/4th place

Finals
 1991-08-11 — 9th/10th place

 1991-08-16 — 7th/8th place

 1991-08-16 — 5th/6th place

 1991-08-17 — Bronze Medal Match

 1991-08-17 — Gold Medal Match

Notes

Final ranking

Awards

Women's competition

Participating nations

Preliminary round

 1991-08-03

 1991-08-04

 1991-08-05

 1991-08-07

 1991-08-08

Semifinals
 1991-08-10

Finals
 1991-08-12 — Bronze Medal Match

 1991-08-12 — Gold Medal Match

Final ranking

Awards

See also
 Basketball at the 1992 Summer Olympics

References

Basketball
1991
1991–92 in North American basketball
1991–92 in South American basketball
International basketball competitions hosted by Cuba